Terror (from French terreur, from Latin terror "great fear", terrere "to frighten") is a policy of political repression and violence intended to subdue political opposition. The term was first used for the Reign of Terror during the French Revolution.

Before the late twentieth century, the term "terrorism" in the English language was often used interchangeably with "terror". Some contemporary writers use the term "terrorism" to refer to acts by groups with a limited political base or parties on the weaker side in asymmetric warfare and "terror" to refer to acts by governments and law enforcement officials, usually within the legal framework of the state. Others consider state terror to be a specific type of terrorism.

Revolutionary and counter-revolutionary terror

Revolutionary terror, also known as "Red Terror", was often used by revolutionary governments to suppress counterrevolutionaries. The first example was the Reign of Terror during the French Revolution in 1794. Other notable examples include the Red Terror in Soviet Russia in 1918–1922, as well as simultaneous campaigns in the Hungarian Soviet Republic and in Finland. In China, Red Terror in 1966 and 1967 started the Cultural revolution.

Counter-revolutionary terror is usually referred to as "White Terror". Notable examples are the terror campaigns in France (1794–1795), in Russia (1917–20), in Hungary (1919–1921) and in Spain. Modern examples of counter-revolutionary terror include Operation Condor in South America.

Terror and terrorism

David Forte states that the primary difference between terror and terrorism is that while terror can be neutrally evil (i.e., random violence committed by robbers, rapists and even military personnel), terrorism has the additional political or moral dimension, being the systematized use of randomly focused violence by organized groups against non-combatants to effect a political objective.

However, Charles Tilly defines "terror" as a political strategy defined as "asymmetrical deployment of threats and violence against enemies using means that fall outside the forms of political struggle routinely operating within some current regime", and therefore ranges from "(1) intermittent actions by members of groups that are engaged in wider political struggles to (2) one segment in the modus operandi of durably organized specialists in coercion, including government-employed and government-backed specialists in coercion to (3) the dominant rationale for distinct, committed groups and networks of activists".

According to Tilly, the term "terror" spans a wide range of human cruelties, from Stalin's use of executions to clandestine attacks by groups like the Basque separatists and the Irish Republican Army and even ethnic cleansing and genocide.

See also
 Balance of terror
 Demoralization (warfare)
 Shock and awe

References

Fear
Violence